Transylvania Twist - Bobby "Boris" Pickett (released in 1962, a novelty song, which along with the more well known Monster Mash, appeared on their album The Original Monster Mash.)
 Transylvania Twist - Sam & The Twisters with Baron Daemon (released in 1963, a completely different novelty song.)
 Transylvania Twist - A 1989 comedy parody on horror movies.
 Transylvania Twist - Kills and Thrills (song released in 2008, on their 'Showstopper' album.)
 The Transylvania Twist - Dr. Rockinstein (released in 2010, a completely different novelty song then those listed above.)